Remember is the eighth extended play by South Korean girl group T-ara. It was released on November 9, 2016, by MBK Entertainment and distributed by Interpark. This is the final EP featuring members Soyeon and Boram.

Background and release 
In October 2016, T-ara announced that they would be releasing a new mini-album produced by Duble Sidekick in November. In October 2016, the release date of the mini-album was announced to be on November 9. On November 1, it was announced that the lead single would be titled "Tiamo", based on how to say "I love you" in Italian, and that it would be a medium tempo track. T-ara then officially released the EP, containing five tracks including the lead single "Tiamo". The music video for "Tiamo" was released on V Live app at 00AM KST and released on YouTube channel at 12PM KST.

Commercial performance 
Remember entered and peaked at number 4 on the Gaon Album Chart, on the chart issue dated November 13–19, 2016. In its second week, the EP fell to number 15 and dropped the chart the following week. The EP entered at number 18 on the chart for the month of November 2016, with 16,015 physical copies sold and sold a total of 17,977 copies by the end of 2016.

The music video for "Tiamo" hit 1 Million views in a day on YouTube and 130 million views within a week on Tudou in China. The music video eventually reached 1 Billion views becoming the most viewed MV by a korean artist on the platform.

Track listing

Charts

Sales

Listicles

Release history

References

2016 EPs
T-ara albums
Korean-language EPs
Chinese-language EPs
Interpark Music EPs